"She Colors My Day" was originally available for download in 2008 though a link on Grant's website with a donation of $1 to the Entertainment Industry Foundation's Women's Cancer Research Fund.  It was later released through iTunes on Mother's Day 2009 on the EP of the same name which also included "Baby Baby" from the Heart in Motion album, "Oh How the Years Go By" from House of Love and the previously unreleased song "Unafraid".  It was expected to be part of a new album to be released later in the year, but has not yet appeared on any album.  "Unafraid", however, saw general release in 2010 on the album Somewhere Down the Road.

Amy Grant and songwriters Cristina Carlino (philosophy founder and creator) & Stuart Mathis are donating all artist and publishing royalties generated by the sale of the song "She Colors My Day" to the Entertainment Industry Foundation's Women's Cancer Research Fund.

Music video
The video of the song, filmed at the Birmingham Botanical Gardens in Birmingham, Alabama, debuted on Amazon on May 12, 2009.

Official versions

Audio versions
 Original download version (3:37)

Video versions
 Original video version (3:48)

Amy Grant songs
2009 singles
2008 songs